This is a list of castles in Israel.

References 

Israel
Israel
Castles
Israel
Castles